UASP may refer to:

 USB Attached SCSI Protocol, in computing
 Pavlodar Airport (ICAO code), Kazakhstan
 Three Unit Assessments or UASPs, part of the Scottish Higher school exams
 Anarchist Union of São Paulo, an organisation; see Anarchism in Brazil